Kline is an unincorporated community located in Pendleton County, West Virginia, United States. Originally known as Clines Cross Roads, its name was changed to Kline in about 1875. The name comes from Samuel Kline (or Cline), an early postmaster.

Kline is located in Greenawalt Gap along Mill Run, a tributary of the South Branch Potomac River.

References

Unincorporated communities in Pendleton County, West Virginia
Unincorporated communities in West Virginia